Winchester '73 is a 1950 American Western film directed by Anthony Mann and starring James Stewart, Shelley Winters, Dan Duryea and Stephen McNally. Written by Borden Chase and Robert L. Richards, the film is about the journey of a prized rifle from one ill-fated owner to another and a cowboy's search for a murderous fugitive. It is the first Western film collaboration between Mann and Stewart, the first of seven films they made together, and was filmed in black and white. It was also the first film where an actor received a percentage of the receipts, a practice since known as "points", as compensation.

Among the film's cast of supporting actors, Rock Hudson portrays a Native American and Tony Curtis plays a besieged cavalry trooper, both in small roles at the beginning of their careers.

The film received a Writers Guild of America Award nomination for Best Written American Western. In 2015, the United States Library of Congress selected the film for preservation in the National Film Registry, finding it "culturally, historically, or aesthetically significant".

Plot
Lin McAdam and Frankie Wilson are searching for Dutch Henry Brown, with whom Lin has a personal score to settle.  They find him in a saloon in Dodge City, Kansas, but cannot fight due to the presence of Sheriff Wyatt Earp. Lin enters the town's Centennial shooting contest for a prized Winchester 1873 rifle. Lin wins and goes to his room at the boarding house to pack. There, Dutch ambushes him, steals the rifle, and rides away with two cohorts.
 
Arriving at Riker's Bar, they find Native American trader Joe Lamont, who sees the prize Winchester and becomes determined to own it. He raises the price of his guns and ammunition supply so high that Dutch and his men cannot afford to buy any. Dutch's only option is to trade the rifle for Lamont's three hundred dollars in gold plus their pick of weapons. Dutch makes the trade and tries to get the rifle back by gambling the three hundred in a poker game against Lamont, but loses.

Lamont takes his guns to meet Native American buyers, but their leader Young Bull prefers the prize Winchester. When Lamont refuses to sell it, he is robbed and scalped.

Meanwhile, former saloon girl Lola is in a wagon with her fiancé Steve Miller traveling toward a new home. Pursued by Young Bull and his warriors, they realize that they will not be able to outrun them. Panicking, Steve jumps on his horse and rides off to find help. Not far ahead, Steve finds a small encampment of soldiers and leads them back to rescue Lola. Lin and Wilson, chased by the same Native Americans, also ride into the encampment that night.

The soldiers are new to the territory. Lin gives their sergeant tactical advice on fighting Native Americans and they prepare for an attack expected early the next morning. After a fierce battle in which Young Bull is killed, the Native Americans leave, while Lin and High-Spade depart to continue searching for Dutch. Unknowingly, they ride past the prize Winchester where Young Bull had dropped it when he fell. It is found by a trooper and the Sergeant gives it to Steve.

Steve and Lola reach the Jameson house, which is set to become theirs. He wants her to stay with the Jamesons while he goes to meet outlaw Waco Johnnie Dean, but Waco and his men arrive unexpectedly, chased by a posse that surrounds the house. Once Waco sees the prize Winchester, he too covets it. He provokes Steve into a gunfight and kills him. Waco and Lola escape the posse and ride to Dutch's hideout. Dutch claims the rifle is his and forces Waco to return it.

The gang goes to Tascosa, Texas to commit a robbery. They are joined by Lin and Wilson. Waco attempts to shoot Lin and is killed, while around them the robbery goes awry and Lola is wounded. Wilson reveals to Lola that Dutch is Lin's brother and that Dutch had robbed a bank and a stagecoach and returned to the family home hoping to hide out. When their father refused to help him, Dutch shot him in the back and Lin has sworn revenge.

Lin confronts Dutch on a rocky hill and calls him by his real name, Matthew. They shoot it out on the hill and Lin kills him with the Winchester.

Cast

Production

The film was originally intended to have been directed by Fritz Lang but Universal did not want Lang to produce the film through his own Diana Productions company. Lang's idea was to have the rifle be Stewart's character's only source of strength and his only excuse for living, making the quest for his rifle a matter of life and death. With Lang out of the picture, Universal produced the film itself with the up-and-coming Anthony Mann, Stewart's choice, directing. Mann had Borden Chase rewrite the script  to make the rifle a bone of contention instead, showing it passing contentiously through the hands of a variety of people.

Stewart had wished to make Harvey for Universal-International but, when the studio could not pay the $200,000 salary ($ in modern dollars) he wanted, studio head William Goetz offered to allow Stewart to make both Harvey and Winchester '73 for a percentage of the profits, spread over some time and at a lower capital gain tax rate than a single payment to Stewart would be. Stewart's then-agent Lew Wasserman was able to get his client 50 percent of the profits, eventually amounting to $600,000, from the film's unexpected success. Stewart's deal also gave him control of the director and co-stars. This is acknowledged today as the first confirmed time in the sound era a film actor received some of the movie's receipts as compensation, a practice now called "points".

Casting
Stewart was already cast in the part of Lin McAdam and spent a lot of time practicing with the rifle so he would look like an authentic Westerner. As Mann later related, "[Stewart] was magnificent walking down a street with a Winchester rifle cradled in his arm. And he was great too actually firing the gun. He studied hard at it. His knuckles were raw with practicing... It was those sorts of things that helped make the film look so authentic, gave it its sense of reality." An expert marksman from the Winchester company, Herb Parsons, did the trick shooting required for the film and assisted Stewart in his training.

Shelley Winters was cast as a dance-hall girl. Winters did not understand the film, nor think much of her part in it, saying, "Here you've got all these men... running around to get their hands on this goddamn rifle instead of going after a beautiful blonde like me. What does that tell you about the values of that picture? If I hadn't been in it, would anybody have noticed?"

The part of Wyatt Earp was given to Will Geer, who was not alone in feeling he was miscast for the role. Millard Mitchell was cast as High-Spade Frankie Wilson. That same year, Mitchell appeared in The Gunfighter, starring Gregory Peck. He would appear in another Stewart-Mann western, The Naked Spur (1953), as a grizzled old prospector.

Jay C. Flippen appeared as cavalry sergeant Wilkes. He would also appear in the second Stewart-Mann Western, Bend of the River (1952), along with Rock Hudson, who appears in Winchester '73 as a Native American.

The Stewart and Mann collaboration established a new persona for Stewart, more violent and disillusioned than ever before, but still likable.

Locations
Winchester '73 was filmed at:
Mescal, Arizona, US
Old Tucson, 201 S. Kinney Road, Tucson, Arizona, US
Backlot, Universal Studios, 100 Universal City Plaza, Universal City, California, US

Reception
As part of the publicity campaign around the release of the film, Universal Pictures sponsored a contest, by placing magazine ads, to find some of the rare remaining "One of One Thousand" Model 1873 Winchester rifles. This resulted in many previously unknown original rifles being brought into the spotlight and drew public interest to the field of antique gun collecting. The winner of the contest received a new Winchester Model 1894 rifle since the Model 1873 was out of production at that time.

The film was a financial success, turning a significant profit.  It has gained a reputation as a classic of the Western genre since and durably helped to redefine the public perception of James Stewart.

Contemporary critics are enthusiastic.  Writing for the Telegraph, Martin Chilton gave the movie 5 stars and described the film as "the first in a series of Western masterpieces". In Empire, William Thomas calls the film "the marvellously-scripted story of a man and a gun". He also awarded 5 stars. The film holds a 100% rating on Rotten Tomatoes based on 27 reviews, with an average of 8.5/10.

Honors
The film received a Writers Guild of America Award nomination for Best Written American Western. In 2015, the United States Library of Congress selected the film for preservation in the National Film Registry, finding it "culturally, historically, or aesthetically significant".

Remake
Winchester '73 was remade as a made-for-TV film in 1967 featuring Tom Tryon, John Saxon, Dan Duryea, John Drew Barrymore, Joan Blondell, John Dehner and Paul Fix. The remake was directed by Herschel Daugherty with cinematography by Bud Thackery.

See also
 Gun (TV series)
 The King's Ankus, a tale in Rudyard Kipling's The Second Jungle Book that follows a valuable object as it causes murderous acts.

References

External links

  (1950 film)
  (1967 TV movie)
 
 Winchester '73 film stills
 Winchester '73 at Dan Duryea Central

1950 films
1950 Western (genre) films
American Western (genre) films
American black-and-white films
Dodge City, Kansas
1950s English-language films
Films directed by Anthony Mann
Films set in Kansas
Films set in the 1870s
Universal Pictures films
American films about revenge
United States National Film Registry films
Cultural depictions of Wyatt Earp
Revisionist Western (genre) films
1950s American films